Ochyromera is a genus of leguminous seed weevils in the beetle family Curculionidae. There are more than 30 described species in Ochyromera.

Species
These 35 species belong to the genus Ochyromera:

 Ochyromera 4-maculata Voss, 1953
 Ochyromera artocarpi Marshall, 1926
 Ochyromera asperata Heller, 1936
 Ochyromera binotata Kojima & Morimoto, 1996
 Ochyromera binubilosa Marshall, 1926
 Ochyromera brevicornis Marshall, 1948
 Ochyromera bryanti Marshall, 1926
 Ochyromera cognata Marshall, 1948
 Ochyromera coronata Marshall, 1948
 Ochyromera decorata Heller, 1929
 Ochyromera dissimilis Pascoe & F.P., 1874
 Ochyromera distinguenda Voss, 1953
 Ochyromera fasciata Faust & J., 1888
 Ochyromera heteroclepta Faust & J., 1888
 Ochyromera hiramatsui Kojima & Morimoto, 1996
 Ochyromera hirsuta Kojima & Morimoto, 1996
 Ochyromera horikawai Kojima & Morimoto, 1996
 Ochyromera japonica Marshall, 1935
 Ochyromera kalshoveni Kojima, 2011
 Ochyromera keteleeriae Kojima, 2011
 Ochyromera ligustri Warner, 1961 (ligustrum weevil)
 Ochyromera miwai Kôno, 1939
 Ochyromera nipponica Kojima & Morimoto, 1996
 Ochyromera penicillatus Marshall & G.A.K., 1926
 Ochyromera pieridis Kojima & Morimoto, 1998
 Ochyromera posticalis Marshall, 1926
 Ochyromera rectirostris Kojima & Morimoto, 1998
 Ochyromera rufescens Pascoe & F.P., 1874
 Ochyromera ryukyuensis Kojima & Morimoto, 1996
 Ochyromera sericea Marshall, 1948
 Ochyromera signatella Voss, 1937
 Ochyromera sonepheti Kojima, 2011
 Ochyromera subcruciata Marshall, 1926
 Ochyromera subvittata Marshall, 1926
 Ochyromera suturalis Kojima & Morimoto, 1996

References

Further reading

 
 
 

Curculioninae
Articles created by Qbugbot